The Florida Marlins' 1999 season was the seventh season for the Major League Baseball (MLB) franchise in the National League.  It would begin with the team attempting to improve on their season from 1998.  Their manager was John Boles. They played home games at Pro Player Stadium. They finished with a record of 64-98, 5th in the NL East.

Offseason
October 28, 1998: Bruce Aven was selected off waivers by the Florida Marlins from the Cleveland Indians.
December 14, 1998: Édgar Rentería was traded by the Florida Marlins to the St. Louis Cardinals for Armando Almanza, Braden Looper, and Pablo Ozuna.
December 23, 1998: Gregg Zaun was sent to the Texas Rangers by the Florida Marlins as part of a conditional deal.

Regular season

Opening Day starters

Season standings

Record vs. opponents

Transactions
June 15, 1999: Craig Counsell was traded by the Florida Marlins to the Los Angeles Dodgers for a player to be named later. The Los Angeles Dodgers sent Ryan Moskau (minors) (July 15, 1999) to the Florida Marlins to complete the trade.

Citrus Series
The season series each year between the Devil Rays and the Florida Marlins has come to be known as the Citrus Series.  In 1999, the Marlins won the series 5 games to 1.
June 4 - Marlins @ Devil Rays: 10 – 0
June 5 - Marlins @ Devil Rays: 9 – 7
June 6 - Marlins @ Devil Rays: 11 – 6
July 9 - Marlins vs Devil Rays: 11 – 4
July 10 - Marlins vs Devil Rays: 8 – 9
July 11 - Marlins vs Devil Rays: 3 – 2

Roster

Player stats

Batting

Starters by position 
Note: Pos = Position; G = Games played; AB = At bats; H = Hits; Avg. = Batting average; HR = Home runs; RBI = Runs batted in

Other batters 
Note: G = Games played; AB = At bats; H = Hits; Avg. = Batting average; HR = Home runs; RBI = Runs batted in

Pitching

Starting pitchers 
Note: G = Games pitched; IP = Innings pitched; W = Wins; L = Losses; ERA = Earned run average; SO = Strikeouts

Other pitchers 
Note: G = Games pitched; IP = Innings pitched; W = Wins; L = Losses; ERA = Earned run average; SO = Strikeouts

Relief pitchers 
Note: G = Games pitched; W = Wins; L = Losses; SV = Saves; ERA = Earned run average; SO = Strikeouts

Farm system

References

External links
1999 Florida Marlins at Baseball Reference
1999 Florida Marlins at Baseball Almanac

Miami Marlins seasons
Florida Marlins season
Miami Marl